Gene Barth (February 1, 1930 – October 11, 1991) was an American football official in the National Football League (NFL).  He was the referee in Super Bowl XVIII, played January 22, 1984.

NFL career
Barth began his career in the NFL as a line judge in 1971, then became a referee five years later. He was selected to officiate Super Bowl XVIII, and was chosen as an alternate for Super Bowl XXIII. He retired after the 1990 season.

Barth wore uniform number 14, which was later worn by Ron Winter and Shawn Smith.

Personal
In addition to officiating in the NFL, Barth was the president of an oil company.

Barth was born February 1, 1930, in St. Louis, Missouri. and died October 11, 1991, in St. Charles, Missouri.  He graduated from Saint Louis University.  He was president of Bonafide Oil Company, located in Hazelwood, Missouri at 5735 Fee Fee Road, a family owned business.  He participated in the St. Louis Senior Olympics, in 1989 and 1990.

Barth died of cancer at St. Joseph Health Center in St. Charles, Mo. on Friday October 11, 1991. He was 61 years old.

References

1930 births
1991 deaths
Deaths from cancer in Missouri
National Football League officials
Senior Olympic competitors
Saint Louis University alumni
Sportspeople from St. Louis